Baptisia (wild indigo, false indigo) is a genus in the legume family, Fabaceae. They are flowering herbaceous perennial plants with pea-like flowers, followed by pods, which are sometimes inflated. They are native to woodland and grassland in eastern and southern North America. The species most commonly found in cultivation is B. australis.

Baptisia species are used as food plants by the larvae of some Lepidoptera species, including the jaguar flower moth, Schinia jaguarina.

Species
Baptisia comprises the following species:

 Baptisia alba (L.) Vent.—white wild indigo
 var. alba (L.) Vent.
 var. macrophylla (Larisey) Isely
 Baptisia albescens Small

 Baptisia arachnifera W.H. Duncan—cobwebby wild indigo, hairy rattleweed (limited to two counties in southeastern Georgia)
 Baptisia australis (L.) R. Br.—blue false indigo, blue wild indigo
 var. australis (L.) R. Br.
 var. minor (Lehm.) Fernald
 Baptisia bicolor Greenm. & Larisey
 Baptisia bracteata Elliott—longbract wild indigo, Plains wild indigo
 var. bracteata Elliott
 var. glabrescens (Larisey) Isely
 var. laevicaulis (Canby) Isely
 var. leucophaea (Nutt.) Kartesz & Gandhi

 Baptisia calycosa Canby—Florida wild indigo
 var. calycosa Canby
 var. villosa Canby
 Baptisia cinerea (Raf.) Fernald & B.G. Schub.—grayhairy wild indigo

 Baptisia deamii Larisey

 Baptisia fragilis Larisey

 Baptisia fulva Larisey

 Baptisia intercalata Larisey
 Baptisia intermedia Larisey

 Baptisia lanceolata (Walter) Elliott—gopherweed (Georgia, Alabama, Florida, South Carolina)
 var. lanceolata (Walter) Elliott
 var. tomentosa (Larisey) Isely
 Baptisia lecontei Torr. & A. Gray—pineland wild indigo

 Baptisia macilenta Small ex Larisey
 Baptisia megacarpa Torr. & A. Gray—Apalachicola wild indigo
 Baptisia microphylla Nutt.

 Baptisia nuttalliana Small—Nuttall's wild indigo

 Baptisia perfoliata (L.) R. Br.—catbells
 Baptisia pinetorum Larisey

 Baptisia serenae M.A. Curtis
 Baptisia simplicifolia Croom—scareweed
 Baptisia sphaerocarpa Nutt.—yellow wild indigo, green wild indigo, round wild indigo
 Baptisia stricta Larisey
 Baptisia sulphurea Engelm.

 Baptisia tinctoria (L.) Vent.—rattleweed, wild indigo, horseflyweed, indigo-broom, yellow broom

Species names with uncertain taxonomic status
The status of the following species is unresolved:
 Baptisia auriculata Sweet
 Baptisia lupinoides Burb.
 Baptisia retusa Raf.

Hybrids
The following hybrids have been described:
 Baptisia ×bushii Small
 Baptisia ×variicolor Kosnik, et al. (Baptisia australis × Baptisia sphaerocarpa)

See also
Indigofera—true indigo

References

Sophoreae
Fabaceae genera